Wang Shizhen (7 March 1916 – 27 May 2016) was a Chinese nuclear medicine physician and academician of the Chinese Academy of Sciences (CAS). He was known as the father of Chinese nuclear medicine.

Biography
Wang Shizhen was born in Chiba, Japan in 1916 to father Wang Xiaoxiang and mother Lin Jianyan, great-granddaughter of Chinese scholar and official Lin Zexu. His grandfather Wang Renkan was the Zhuangyuan of the 3rd year of Guangxu (1877) imperial examination and his great-great-grandfather Wang Qingyun was the Viceroy of Liangguang in 1859. He returned to his hometown Fuzhou after his father finished his study in Japan.

Wang entered Yenching University at the age of 17 and transferred to Tsinghua University one year later. He received his bachelor's degree of chemistry in 1937. He became a lecturer at Guiyang Medical University after the Second Sino-Japanese War broke. He became the first Chinese to synthesize DDT during the war. Wang moved to Canada and entered University of Toronto for pharmacology in 1946. He transferred to University of Iowa half year later, majoring in chemistry. He worked for Institute of radioactivity of University of Iowa after his graduation.

Wang returned to China in 1951 and was assigned work at Peking Union Medical College. He built China's first isotope laboratory and developed the application techniques and methods of isotope treatment in China in 1956. He then became a nuclear medicine physician at Peking Union Medical College Hospital. Wang was elected as academician of Chinese Academy of Sciences in 1980.

Wang died on 27 May 2016 at the age of 100 in Beijing.

References

1916 births
2016 deaths
20th-century Chinese physicians
21st-century Chinese physicians
Chinese centenarians
Chinese nuclear medicine physicians
Members of the Chinese Academy of Sciences
Men centenarians
People from Chiba (city)
People from Fuzhou
Scientists from Fujian
Tsinghua University alumni
University of Toronto alumni
University of Iowa alumni
Yenching University alumni